Red River is a town in Kewaunee County, Wisconsin, United States. The population was 1,393 at the 2010 census, down from 1,476 at the 2000 census. The unincorporated communities of Bay View, Duvall, Frog Station, Thiry Daems, and Tonet are located in the town. The census-designated place of Dyckesville is also located partially in the town.

Geography
The town is in the northwest corner of Kewaunee County; it is bordered to the north by Door County, to the west by Brown County, and to the northwest by Green Bay of Lake Michigan.

The town was once the site of a large Native American community and today contains multiple archeological sites.

Demographics
As of the census of 2000, there were 1,476 people, 528 households, and 419 families residing in the town. The population density was 42.5 people per square mile (16.4/km2).  There were 601 housing units at an average density of 17.3 per square mile (6.7/km2). The racial makeup of the town was 98.98% White, 0.14% African American, 0.20% Native American, and 0.68% from two or more races. Hispanic or Latino of any race were 0.34% of the population.

There were 528 households, out of which 34.1% had children under the age of 18 living with them, 71.6% were married couples living together, 5.3% had a female householder with no husband present, and 20.5% were non-families. 15.9% of all households were made up of individuals, and 8.9% had someone living alone who was 65 years of age or older. The average household size was 2.79 and the average family size was 3.14.

In the town, the population was spread out, with 25.4% under the age of 18, 9.4% from 18 to 24, 27.6% from 25 to 44, 23.4% from 45 to 64, and 14.2% who were 65 years of age or older. The median age was 37 years. For every 100 females, there were 105.3 males. For every 100 females age 18 and over, there were 103.5 males.

The median income for a household in the town was $47,833, and the median income for a family was $55,250. Males had a median income of $35,571 versus $21,892 for females. The per capita income for the town was $19,673. About 3.5% of families and 6.1% of the population were below the poverty line, including 5.5% of those under age 18 and 9.8% of those age 65 or over.

Most Belgian-American towns 
Red River is the second-most Belgian-American community in the United States, with 47% of its population reporting Belgian ancestry in 2000.

 1) Union, Door County, Wisconsin : 49%
 2) Red River, Wisconsin (Kewaunee County) : 47%
 3) Brussels, Wisconsin (Door County) : 36.4%   ( composed of "Brussels community" & "Namur Community")
 4) Lincoln, Kewaunee County, Wisconsin : 35.4%
 5) Green Bay (town), Wisconsin (Brown County) : 31.8% (including Champion, Wisconsin)

References

External links
Official website

Towns in Kewaunee County, Wisconsin
Green Bay metropolitan area
Belgian-American culture in Wisconsin
Towns in Wisconsin